Taiyafeh may refer to:
 Taiyafeh-ye Ali Jan
 Taiyafeh-ye Babakhan
 Taiyafeh-ye Hazrat-e Soleyman
 Taiyafeh-ye Seyfollah
 Taiyafeh-ye Shaeran
 Taiyafeh-ye Shirzadi